Manuel Muñoz may refer to:
Manuel Muñoz (canoeist) (born 1980), Spanish sprint canoer
Manuel Muñoz (footballer) (1928–2022), Chilean football forward
Manuel Muñoz (Governor of Spanish Texas) (1730–1799), soldier and governor of Spanish Texas
Manuel Muñoz (writer) (born 1972), American short story writer